Aglaia costata is a species of tree in the family Meliaceae. It is endemic to the Philippines.

References

costata
Endemic flora of the Philippines
Trees of the Philippines
Vulnerable plants
Taxonomy articles created by Polbot